Bob Lutz or Robert Lutz may refer to:
Bob Lutz (American football) (active 1969-2012), American high school football coach
Bobby Lutz (basketball) (born 1958), American college basketball coach
Bob Lutz (businessman) (born 1932), retired auto industry executive
Bob Lutz (tennis) (born 1947), American tennis player of the 1970s

See also 
Lutz